Qu'Appelle may refer to:

Places
 Rural Municipality of North Qu'Appelle No. 187, Saskatchewan, Canada
 Fort Qu'Appelle, a town in Saskatchewan
 Rural Municipality of South Qu'Appelle No. 157, Saskatchewan, Canada
 Qu'Appelle, Saskatchewan, a town in Saskatchewan
 Qu'Appelle River, a river in Saskatchewan and Manitoba
 Qu'Appelle River Dam, a dam in Saskatchewan
 Qu'Appelle Lakes, a chain of lakes in Saskatchewan
 Diocese of Qu'Appelle, diocese of the Anglican Church of Canada
 Chateau Qu'Appelle, hotel

Electoral districts
 Regina—Qu'Appelle, federal electoral district in Saskatchewan
 North Qu'Appelle, a former provincial electoral district in Saskatchewan
 South Qu'Appelle, a former provincial electoral district in Saskatchewan
 Qu'Appelle (N.W.T. electoral district), a former territorial electoral district in the Northwest Territories, Canada

Ships
 
 , World War II River-class destroyer
 CSTC HMCS Qu'Appelle, Cadet Summer Training Centre HMCS